Sivertsen is a surname. Notable people with the surname include:

Adelsten Sivertsen (1925–2010), Norwegian businessperson
Celine Sivertsen (born 1993), Norwegian handball player
Cort Sivertsen (1622–1675), Norwegian seaman
Eirik Sivertsen (born 1971), Norwegian politician
Halvdan Sivertsen (born 1950), Norwegian singer-songwriter and guitarist
Helge Sivertsen (1913–1986), Norwegian discus thrower and politician
Jan Sivertsen (born 1951), Danish painter
Kenneth Sivertsen (musician) (1961–2006), Norwegian musician, composer, poet, and comedian
Kenneth Sivertsen (skier) (born 1973), Norwegian alpine skier
Odin Sivertsen (1914–2008), Norwegian politician
Oskar Sivertsen (born 2004), Norwegian footballer
Sigvard Sivertsen (1881–1963), Norwegian gymnast and Olympic competitor
Stian Sivertsen (born 1989), Norwegian snowboarder
Sture Sivertsen (born 1966), Norwegian Cross-country skier

See also
Sivert (disambiguation)

Norwegian-language surnames